Greek Colonization refers to the expansion of Archaic Greeks, particularly during the 8th–6th centuries BC, across the Mediterranean Sea and the Black Sea.

The Archaic expansion differed from the Iron Age migrations of the Greek Dark Ages, in that it consisted of organised direction (see ) away from the originating metropolis rather than the simplistic movement of tribes, which characterized the aforementioned earlier migrations.

Motives

Reasons for colonisation had to do with the demographic explosion of this period, the development of the emporium, the need for a secure supply of raw materials, but also with the emerging politics of the period that drove sections of the population into exile. Population growth created a scarcity of farmland and a restriction of the ability of smallholders to farm it, which was similar in every city-state. In places with surplus population, this led to a demand for additional living space. The location of each colonial establishment was dictated by the supply of unexploited resources that would provide the metropolis, as well as the finished goods it would produce. The development of the emporium was among the more important motivations for the founding of a colony. The colonies created new markets, supplied the metropolis with significant raw materials and constituted important way stations on the long-distance trade journeys of the era. Finally, the troubled political situation in many cities, along with the establishment of tyrannical government, drove the political opposition into exile and into a search for new places of residence.

Characteristics 

The founding of the colonies was consistently an organised enterprise. The launch was organised by the metropolis, although in many cases they collaborated with other cities. The place to be colonised was selected in advance with the goal of offering business advantages, but also security from raiders. In order to create a feeling of security and confidence in relation to the new colony, the choice of place was decided according to its usefulness. The mission always included a leader nominated by the colonists. In the new cities, the colonists parceled out the land, including farms. The system of governance usually took a form reminiscent of that which prevailed in the metropolis.

Timing

The first founders of colonies were the Euboeans, who founded colonies at the beginning of the 8th century BC in Southern Italy and Chalcidice. The two most powerful states on Euboea, Chalcis and Eretria founded numerous colonies in Chalcidice, the most important of which was Olynthus, and they were the first to found colonies in Southern Italy. The first colony that they founded there was Pithecusae on the Isle of Ischia. Subsequently, they founded the colonies of Cumae, Zancle, Rhegium and Naxos.

At the end of the 8th century, Euboea fell into decline with the outbreak of the Lelantine War and the baton of colonial foundation was passed to other Greek cities. In the 7th century, many colonies were founded in Ionia, Southern Italy, Thrace and on the Black Sea. Other Greek colonies were founded on the coast of Gaul, on the Cyrenaica peninsula in Africa and also in Egypt. In this burst of colonial expansion cities such as Corinth, Miletus, Megara and Phocaea took the lead.

Locations

Macedonia and Thrace 

Numerous colonies were founded in Northern Greece, chiefly in the region of Chalcidice but also in the region of Thrace.

Chalcidice was settled by Euboeans, chiefly from Chalcis, who lent their name to these colonies. The most important settlements of the Euboeans in Chalcidice were Olynthos (which colony was settled in collaboration with the Athenians), Torone, Mende, Sermyle, Aphytis and Cleonae in the peninsula of Athos. Other important colonies in Chalcidice were Acanthus, a colony which was founded by colonists from Andros and Potidaea, a colony of Corinth. Thasians with the help of the Athenian Callistratus of Aphidnae founded the city of Datus.
During the Peloponnesian War, the Athenians with the Hagnon, son of Nikias founded the city of Ennea Hodoi (Ἐννέα ὁδοὶ), meaning nine roads, at the place were now is the 'Hill 133' north of Amphipolis in Serres.

Numerous other colonies were founded in the region of Thrace by the Ionians from the coast of Asia Minor. Important colonies were Maroneia, and Abdera. The Milesians also founded Abydos and Cardia on the Hellespont and Rhaedestus in Propontis. The Samians colonized the island of Samothrace, becoming the source of its name. Finally, the Parians colonised Thasos under the leadership of the oecist and father of the poet Archilochus, Telesicles.

In 340 BCE, while Alexander the Great was regent of Macedon, he founded the city of Alexandropolis Maedica after defeating a local Thracian tribe.

Ionian Sea, Adriatic Sea, and Illyria 
The region of the Ionian Sea and that of Illyria were colonized strictly by Corinth. The Corinthians founded important overseas colonies on the sea lanes to Southern Italy and the west which succeeded in making them the foremost emporia of the western side of the Mediterranean. Important colonies of Corinth included Leucada, Astacus, Anactoreum, Actium, Ambracia, and Corcyra. The Corinthians also founded important colonies in Illyria, which evolved into important cities, Apollonia and Epidamnus. The fact that about the 6th century BC the citizens of Epidamnus constructed a Doric-style treasury at Olympia confirms that the city was among the richest of the Ancient Greek world. An ancient account describes Epidamnos as ‘a great power and very populated’ city. Nymphaeum was another Greek colony in Illyria. The Abantes of Euboea founded the city of Thronion at the Illyria.

In 1877, archaeologists discovered in Lumbarda on the island of Korčula, in modern-day Croatia, a Greek inscription that writes about the founding of an Ancient Greek settlement on the island. The artifact is known as Lumbarda Psephisma.

Magna Graecia: southern Italy and Sicily

The first to colonize Southern Italy were the Euboeans, who with the move to Pithecusae (on the isle of Ischia), founded a series of cities in that region. The second city that they founded was Cumae, nearly opposite Ischia. The colonists from Cumae founded Zancle in on Sicily, and nearby on the opposite coast, Rhegium. Further, the Euboeans founded Naxos, which became the base for the founding of the cities of Leontini, Tauromenion and Catania. In this effort they were accompanied by small numbers of Dorians and Ionians; the Athenians had notably refused to take part in the colonization.

The strongest of the Sicilian colonies was Syracuse, an 8th-century B.C. colony of the Corinthians. Colonists of that same period from Achaea founded the cities of Sybaris and Croton in the Gulf of Taranto but also in the Metapontum in the same district. In the same area, refugees from Sparta founded Taranto which evolved into one of the most powerful cities in the area. Other Greek states that founded cities in Southern Italy were Megara, which founded Megara Hyblaea, and Selinous; Phocaea, which founded Elea; Rhodes, which founded Gela together with the Cretans and Lipari together with Cnidus, even as the Locrians founded Epizephyrean Locris. According to legend, Lagaria which was between Thurii and the river Sinni River was founded by Phocians.

Many cities in the region became in turn metropolia for new colonies such as the Syracusans, who founded the city of Camarina in the south of Sicily; or the Zancleans, who led the founding of the colony of Himera. Likewise, Naxos, which we see taking further part in the founding of many colonies while the city of Sybaris founded the colony of Poseidonia to its north. The city of Gela which was a colony of Rhodes and Crete founded its own colony, Acragas.

The areas of settlement in Southern Italy became so thoroughly Hellenised that Roman writers such as Ovid and Polybius referred to the region as Magna Graecia ("Great Greece"). To this day, some of the Griko people in Southern Italy still speak Griko and Calabrian Greek, Doric Greek-influenced dialects with a substantial Latin adstrate, and worship in the Greek Byzantine Catholic Church instead of the Latin rite more usual among other Italians. In Modern Greek, Southern Italy is referred to as Kato Italia (lit. "Lower Italy") and the relict Greek dialects there as Katoitalika.

Black Sea and Propontis

The Greeks had at one point called the Black Sea shore "inhospitable". According to ancient sources, they eventually created 70 to 90 colonies. The colonization of the Black Sea was led by the Megarans and some of the Ionian cities such as Miletus, Phocaea and Teos. The majority of colonies in the region of the Black Sea and Propontis were founded in the 7th century B.C. In the area of Propontis, the Megarans founded the cities of Astacus in Bithynia, Chalcedonia and Byzantium in which they occupied a privileged position. Miletus founded Cyzicus and the Phocaeans Lampsacus.

On the western shore of the Black Sea region the Megarans founded the cities of Selymbria and a little later, Nesebar. A little farther north in the region of today's Romania the Milesians founded the cities of Istria and Orgame. And Miletus also founded a city on the western shore of the Black Sea, Apollonia. In the south of the Black Sea the most important colony was Sinope which according to prevailing opinion was founded by Miletus. The precise chronology of its foundation is not known at present but it appears that it was founded some time around the middle of the 7th century B.C. Sinope was founded with a series of other colonies in the Pontic region: Trebizond, Cerasus, Cytorus, Cotyora, Cromne, Pteria, Tium, et al. The most important colony founded on the southern shore of the Black Sea was likewise a Megaran foundation: Heraclea Pontica, which was founded in the 6th century B.C.

On the north shore of the Black Sea Miletus was the first to start. The colonies of Miletus in this region of the Black Sea were Pontic Olbia and Panticapaeum (modern Kerch.) Later in the 6th century B.C. the Milesians founded Odessa in the region of modern Ukraine. Further north from the Danube delta the Greeks colonized an islet, modern Berezan (probably then a peninsula). That location is found at the confluence of the Bug estuary (the River Hypanis to the Ancient Greeks) and the Dnieper (the Barysthenes to the Ancient Greeks) The islet or peninsula itself was called by the ancients Barythmenis; across from this, they found the site that would be settled later as Olbia. Next to Olbia was another Greek colony that had Istria as its mother city.

On the Crimean peninsula (the Greeks then called it Tauric Chersonese or "Peninsula of the Bulls") they founded likewise the cities of Sympheropolis, and Nymphaeum and Hermonassa. On the Sea of Azov (Lake Maiotis to the ancients) they founded Tanais (in Rostov), Tyritace, Myrmeceum, Cecrine and Phanagoria—the last being a colony of the Teians. In 2018, archaeologists discovered a previously unknown ancient Greek settlement of the 4th-3rd centuries BC near the town of Baherove in Crimea. According to the researchers, the settlement was called Manitra.

On the eastern shore, which was known in ancient times as Colchis and in which today for the greater part is in Georgia and the autonomous region of Abkhazia, the Greeks founded the cities of Phasis and Dioscouris. The latter was called Sebastopolis by the Romans and Byzantines and is known today as Sukhumi—the ruins of the ancient and Byzantine foundations are now found principally below the waterline.

Wider Mediterranean 

The Greek colonies expanded as far as the Iberian Peninsula and North Africa. In North Africa, on the peninsula of Kyrenaika, colonists from Thera founded Kyrene, which evolved into a very powerful city in the region. Other colonies in Kyrenaika later included Barca, Euesperides (modern Benghazi), Taucheira, and Apollonia.

On the north side of the Mediterranean, the Phokaians founded Massalia on the coast of Gaul. Massalia became the base for a series of further foundations farther away in the region of Spain. Phokaia also founded Alalia in Corsica and Olbia in Sardinia. The Phokaians arrived next on the coast of the Iberian peninsula. As related by Herodotus, a local king summoned the Phokaians to found a colony in the region and rendered meaningful aid in the fortification of the city. The Phokaians founded Empuries in this region and later the even more distant Hemeroskopeion.

By the middle of the 7th century, the lone Greek colony in Egypt had been founded, Naukratis. The pharaoh Psammitecus I gave a trade concession to Milesian merchants for one establishment on the banks of the Nile, founding a trading post which evolved into a prosperous city by the time of the Persian expedition to Egypt in 525 B.C.

Similar to the emporion established in the Nile Delta it is possible there was a Greek trading colony established by the Euboians along the Syrian coast on the mouth of the Orontes river at the site Al-Mina in the early 8th century BC. The Greek colony of Posideion on the promontory Ras al-Bassit was colonised just to the south of the Orontes estuary later in the 7th century BC.

Greek colonies before Alexander the Great (pre-336 BC)

Modern Egypt

E1. Naucratis

Modern Libya

L1. Barce
L2. Cyrene
L3. Balagrae
L4. Taucheira
L5. Ptolemais
L6. Euesperides
L7. Antipyrgus
L8. Apollonia
L9. Cinyps

Modern Spain

S1. Portus Illicitanus
S2. Akra Leuke
S3. Alonis
S4. Hemeroscopeum
S5. Zakynthos
S6. Salauris
S7. Rhode
S8. Emporion
S9. Kalathousa
S10. Mainake
S11. Menestheus's Limin
S12. Kypsela
S13. Helike

Modern France

F1. Agde
F2. Massalia
F3. Tauroention
F4. Olbia
F5. Nicaea
F6. Monoikos
F7. Antipolis
F8. Alalia
F9. Rhodanousia
F10. Athenopolis

Modern Italy

 *  According to ancient writers Scylletium was a Greek colony, but there are no other evidence other than that.

I1. Olbia
I2. Adria
I3. Ancona
I4. Parthenope
I5. Cumae
I6. Procida
I7. Dicaearchia
I8. Neapolis
I9. Poseidonia
I10. Metapontum
I11. Sybaris
I12. Thurii
I13. Taras
I14. Siris
I15. Crotona
I16. Gallipoli
I17. Elea
I18. Messina
I19. Kale Akte
I21. Syracuse
I22. Didyme
I23. Hycesia
I24. Phoenicusa
I26. Therassía
I27. Lipara/Meligounis
I28. Epizepherean Locris
I29. Rhegium
I30. Lentini
I31. Selinountas
I32. Megara Hyblaea
I33. Naxos
I34. Tauromenion
I35. Acragas
I36. Himera
I37. Gela
I38. Catania
I39. Leontini
I40. Ereikousa
I41. Euonymos
I42. Kamarina
I43. Medma
I44. Hipponion
I45. Heraclea Minoa
I46. Caulonia
I47. Trotilon
I48. Pyxous
I49. Mylae
I50. Laüs
I51. Terina
I52. Rhegion
I53. Tindari
I54. Macalla
I55. Temesa
I56. Metauros
I57. Krimisa
I58. Chone
I59. Saturo
I60. Heraclea Lucania, Siris
I61. Scylletium  * 
I62. Agathyrnum
I63. Adranon
I64. Akrillai
I65. Casmenae
I66. Akrai
I67. Engyon
I68. Thapsos
I69. Pithekoussai
I70. Castelmezzano
I71. Licata
I72. Avella

Modern Croatia

C1. Salona
C2. Tragyrion
C3. Aspálathos
C4. Epidaurus
C5. Issa
C6. Dimos
C7. Pharos
C8. Kórkyra Mélaina
C9. Epidaurum
C10. Narona
C11. Lumbarda

Modern Montenegro

M1. Bouthoe

Modern Albania

AL1. Nymphaeum
AL2. Epidamnos
AL3. Apollonia
AL4. Aulon
AL5. Chimara
AL6. Bouthroton
AL7. Oricum
AL8. Thronion

Modern Serbia 
 *  Some historians believe that it was near the modern Resen (North Macedonia) while others believe that it was near the modern Vranje (Serbia).

SE1. Damastion  * 

Modern North Macedonia
 *  Some historians believe that it was near the modern Resen (North Macedonia) while others believe that it was near the modern Vranje (Serbia).

MA1. Damastion  * 
MA2. Heraclea Lyncestis

Modern Greece

GR1. Potidaea
GR2. Stageira
GR3. Acanthus
GR4. Mende
GR5. Ambracia
GR6. Corcyra
GR7. Maroneia
GR8. Krinides
GR9. Olynthus
GR10. Abdera
GR11. Therma
GR12. Arethusa
GR13. Leucas
GR14. Eion
GR15. Sane
GR16. Amphipolis
GR17. Argilus
GR18. Sane
GR19. Akanthos
GR20. Astacus
GR21. Galepsus
GR22. Oesyme
GR23. Phagres
GR24. Datus
GR25. Stryme
GR26. Pistyrus
GR27. Rhaecelus
GR28. Dicaea
GR29. Methoni
GR30. Heraclea in Trachis
GR31. Heraclea in Acarnania
GR32. Anactorium
GR33. Sale
GR34. Drys
GR35. Toroni
GR36. Amorgos
GR37. Actium
GR38. Scabala
GR39. Philippi
GR40. Colonides
GR41. Oliarus

Modern Bulgaria

 *  Pseudo-Scymnus writes that some say that the city of Bizone belongs to the barbarians, while others to be a Greek colony of Mesembria.

BUL1. Mesembria
BUL2. Odessos
BUL3. Apollonia / Antheia
BUL4. Callatis
BUL5. Agathopolis
BUL6. Kavarna
BUL7. Pomorie
BUL8. Naulochos
BUL9. Krounoi
BUL10. Pistiros
BUL11. Anchialos
BUL12. Bizone * 
BUL13. Develtos
BUL14. Heraclea Sintica
BUL15. Beroe

Modern Romania

RO1. Tomis
RO2. Histria/Istros
RO3. Aegyssus
RO4. Stratonis
RO5. Axiopolis
RO6. Kallatis

Modern Cyprus

CY1. Chytri
CY2. Kyrenia

Modern Ukraine

U1. Borysthenes
U2. Tyras
U3. Olbia
U4. Nikonion
U5. Odessa

Modern Crimea  *  Russia annexed Crimea in 2014 and unofficially it is no longer part of Ukraine.

CR1. Panticapaeum
CR2. Nymphaion
CR3. Tyritake
CR4. Theodosia
CR5. Chersonesus
CR6. Charax
CR7. Myrmekion
CR8. Kerkinitis
CR9. Kimmerikon
CR10. Kalos Limen
CR11. Yalita
CR12. Akra

Modern Russia

RU1. Tanais
RU2. Kepoi
RU3. Phanagoria
RU4. Bata
RU5. Gorgippia
RU6. Hermonassa
RU7. Korokondame
RU8. Taganrog
RU9. Tyramba
RU10. Patraeus
RU11. Toricos

Modern Georgia/ Abkhazia  *  Abkhazia is recognised only by Russia and a small number of other countries.

G1. Bathys
G2. Triglite
G3. Pityus
G4. Dioscurias
G5. Phasis
G6. Gyenos

Modern Turkey

TR1. Selymbria
TR2. Heraclea Pontica
TR3. Cius
TR4. Ephesus
TR5. Dios Hieron
TR6. Iasos
TR7. Myndus
TR8. Selge
TR9. Priene
TR10. Halicarnassus
TR11. Miletus
TR12. Tralles
TR13. Phaselis
TR14. Aspendos
TR15. Side
TR16. Sillyon
TR17. Zephyrion
TR18. Kelenderis
TR19. Mallus
TR20. Amos
TR21. Byzantium
TR22. Amaseia
TR23. Amastris
TR24. Ainos
TR25. Berge
TR26. Perinthos
TR27. Cardia
TR28. Chalcedon
TR29. Nicomedia
TR30. Abydos
TR31. Sestos
TR32. Lampsacus
TR33. Panormos
TR34. Cyzicus
TR35. Ilion
TR36. Sigeion
TR37. Sinope
TR38. Tirebolu
TR39. Amisos
TR40. Tripolis
TR41. Cotyora
TR42. Polemonion
TR43. Pharnakia
TR44. Kerasous
TR45. Trapezous
TR46. Themiscyra
TR47. Astacus in Bithynia
TR48. Assos
TR49. Pitane
TR50. Phocaea
TR51. Smyrna
TR52. Pergamon
TR53. Teos
TR55. Colophon
TR56. Patara
TR57. Canae
TR58. Bargylia
TR59. Madytus
TR60. Elaeus
TR61. Tieion 
TR62. Apamea Myrlea 
TR63. Klazomenai
TR64. Notion
TR65. Parion
TR66. Heraion Teichos
TR67. Bisanthe
TR68. Erythrae
TR69. Priapus
TR70. Alopeconnesus
TR71. Limnae
TR73. Crithote
TR74. Pactya
TR75. Perinthus
TR76. Tium
TR77. Teichiussa
TR78. Triopium
TR79. Placia
TR80. Scylace
TR81. Arisba
TR82. Apollonia
TR83. Apollonia ad Rhyndacum
TR84. Myrina
TR85. Pythopolis
TR86. Cytorus
TR87. Armene
TR88. Kolonai
TR89. Paesus
TR90. Scepsis
TR91. Myus
TR92. Mallus
TR93. Mopsus
TR94. Caryanda
TR95. Athenae
TR96. Syrna
TR97. Cyme
TR98. Marathesium
TR99. Chrysopolis
TR100. Neonteikhos
TR101. Artace
TR102. Semystra
TR103. Cobrys
TR104. Cypasis
TR105. Kydonies
TR106. Coryphas
TR107. Heraclea (Aeolis)
TR108. Gargara
TR109. Lamponeia
TR110. Elaea
TR111. Mariandyn
TR112. Claros
TR113. Knidos
TR114. Prusias ad Hypium
TR115. Dardanus
TR116. Pygela
TR117. Temnos
TR118. Gryneium
TR119. Aigai
TR120. Rhoiteion
TR121. Cadrema

Notes

References

Further reading

External links
 Greek colonies to 500 BCE
 Ancient Greek Colonization and Trade and their Influence on Greek Art-The Metropolitan Museum of Art
 TOPOSTEXT: EDUCATION / REFERENCE TOOL FOR GREEK CIVILIZATION

Greek colonies
Archaic Greece